Ogden City School District is the school district serving Ogden, Utah, United States. The superintendent, as of July 2021, is Luke Rasmussen. The district was established in 1849. It is an inner-city district, enriched by multicultural diversity. It operates 13 elementary schools, three junior high schools, two comprehensive high schools, an alternative high school and a Youth In Care (YIC) program which serves students from all parts of Utah and a youth-in-custody school.

History
The Ogden School District was established in 1849. It consists of 20 schools: 13 elementary schools, 3 middle schools, 3 high schools and 1 alternate high school.
Ben Lomond High School was established in 1952. It was named for the Ben Lomond Peak, which Scottish immigrants named because it reminded them of the Ben Lomond Mountains in Scotland.

In 2006 the District funded the renovation of Ben Lomond High School and Ogden High School using a bond. Construction began in June 2007, and finished in August 2010. 
The renovations were impressive; the Ogden School District and Ben Lomond High School were recognized and awarded with The Mountain States Construction Silver Award.

Schools

High schools

Ben Lomond High School
Ogden High School
George Washington High School

Junior high schools

Highland Junior High is a secondary school serving the northern third of the city of Ogden
Mound Fort Junior High is a secondary school located in the central part of Ogden
Mount Ogden Junior High is a secondary school serving the southern part of Ogden

Elementary schools
Bonneville Elementary School
East Ridge Elementary School
Heritage Elementary School
Hillcrest Elementary School
Lincoln Elementary School
James Madison Elementary School
New Bridge Elementary School
Odyssey Elementary School
Polk Elementary School
Shadow Valley Elementary School
Taylor Canyon Elementary School
T.O. Smith Elementary School
Wasatch Elementary School

References

External links
 Official website

School districts in Utah
Education in Weber County, Utah